Burton Township may refer to:

Canada
 Burton Township, Ontario, now part of Whitestone

United States
 Burton Township, Adams County, Illinois
 Burton Township, McHenry County, Illinois
 Burton Township, Yellow Medicine County, Minnesota
 Burton Township, Howard County, Missouri
 Burton Township, Geauga County, Ohio

Township name disambiguation pages